Jafariyeh is a city in Qom Province, Iran.

Jafariyeh may also refer to:
 Jafariyeh, Hamadan
 Jafariyeh, Razavi Khorasan
 Jafariyeh, South Khorasan
 Jafariyeh, Tehran